The Women's Pole Vault event at the 2009 World Championships in Berlin, Germany was held between 15 August and 17 August 2009. Yelena Isinbayeva was the strong favourite prior to the competition, a position enhanced further by the withdrawal of 2008 Olympic silver medallist Jennifer Stuczynski. Anna Rogowska was the only athlete to beat Isinbayeva in the buildup to the event. Fabiana Murer and Monika Pyrek had both registered strong season's bests but had suffered from indifferent form. European Indoor medallists Yuliya Golubchikova and Silke Spiegelburg rounded out the list of the season's highest jumping athletes.

In the qualifiers, the automatic progression mark of 4.60 m was not needed, as eleven athletes reached 4.55 m and Kristina Gadschiew progressed with 4.50 m. All four Russian athletes reached the final, as did all three vaulters of the host nation's team. Veteran American athlete and former world record holder Stacy Dragila closed her major championship career with a jump of 4.25 m, as she announced her intention to retire at the end of the season.

On the final day of the event, European Indoor champion Golubchikova was the first to experience disappointment, as a fall in the warm up left her unable to compete in the final. The Brazilian and British champions, Murer and Kate Dennison failed at the 4.65 m mark. Pyrek and American Chelsea Johnson passed that height on their first attempt, while Rogowska and home favourite Spiegelburg completed it on their second try. Rogowska was the only athlete to vault 4.75 m, at which point reigning champion Isinbayeva entered the competition. The Russian failed to clear the height and, after raising the bar, failed twice more and finished last in the competition.

Given that Isinbayeva had a season's best of 4.80 m, an opener of 4.75 m was a risky decision that back fired for the athlete, resulting in her first major championship loss since 2003 and her first ever non-medalling performance in international competition. Rogowska, who had beaten her at the London Grand Prix a month earlier, won her first gold medal at a major championships, breaking Isinbayeva's dominance of the event. Pyrek repeated her form of the 2005 Championships to take a silver medal along with Chelsea Johnson, a relatively unknown athlete competing at her first major championships. For the first time in history of World Championships in Athletics, two Polish athletes took gold and silver medal in the same event.

Medalists

Records

Qualification standards

Schedule

Results

Qualification
Qualification: Qualifying Performance 4.60 (Q) or at least 12 best performers (q) advance to the final.

Key:  NM = no mark (i.e. no valid result), NR = National record, q = qualification by overall place, SB = Seasonal best

Final

Key:  DNS = Did not start, NM = no mark (i.e. no valid result), SB = Seasonal best

References
General
Pole vault results. IAAF. Retrieved on 2009-08-16.
Specific

P
Pole vault at the World Athletics Championships
2009 in women's athletics